Neoconocephalus ensiger, known generally as the sword-bearing conehead or swordbearer, is a species of conehead in the family Tettigoniidae. It is found in North America.

References

ensiger
Articles created by Qbugbot
Insects described in 1841